Eric Norton Tindall (born 28 August 1944) was a rugby union player who represented Australia.

Tindall, a scrum-half, was born in Sydney and claimed 1 international rugby cap for Australia.

References

Australian rugby union players
Australia international rugby union players
1944 births
Living people
Rugby union players from Sydney
Rugby union scrum-halves